The Historic Districts Council (HDC) is a New York City-based 501(c)3 nonprofit organization that serves as the advocate for New York City's historic buildings, neighborhoods, and public spaces. HDC's YouTube channel provides a large catalog of free walking tour videos, Preservation School classes, conference panels, and other educational programming.

History 
HDC was founded in 1970 as a committee of the Municipal Art Society consisting of a coalition of community groups from the designated historic districts of New York City (of which there were then only 14), to serve as their representative, and to advocate for more support for the newly created Landmarks Preservation Commission. In the late 1970s, its focus shifted as it began to advocate for the designation of additional historic districts.

In 1985, HDC became an independent, incorporated organization with its own officers. HDC hired its first full-time executive director in 1992.

HDC's offices are located in the former rectory of St. Mark's Church in-the-Bowery, at 232 East 11th Street, in the East Village neighborhood of Manhattan in New York City. The organization shares space with the Greenwich Village Society for Historic Preservation.

Frampton Tolbert is the executive director.

Advocacy 
In New York City, HDC is the only advocate for designated historic districts and for neighborhoods meriting preservation in all five boroughs. HDC organizes neighborhood residents in their efforts to gain protection for their communities, assists property owners through the Landmarks Preservation Commission's processes, and monitors preserved properties. HDC also helps promote historic districts and holds annual conferences on topics related to preservation.

HDC is an independent, private organization, although it works with the city government,  other preservation organizations, and individual neighborhood groups. As advocate for New York's over 150 designated historic districts, HDC advises community groups about preservation issues and consults with building owners about what Landmarks Preservation Commission regulations mean. HDC is the only organization in the city that covers all applications.

As advocate for neighborhoods not designated but meriting protection, HDC advises community groups that come to it because they are seeking historic designation. An HDC staff member meets with them in their neighborhoods to talk about what designation means and advises them how to proceed. They then make concrete suggestions and then counsel groups on how to apply for designation, on what kind of research is necessary and how to get it done. HDC always stress the importance of community support and help local groups obtain it. Sometimes HDC initiates the designation process itself, usually in nonresidential areas that do not have local community leaders. In those cases, HDC sponsors the work that would otherwise be done by a community group. HDC also sponsors applications to New York State and National Registers of Historic Places. Listing on these Registers often helps move the designation process forward at the Landmarks Preservation Commission.

To preserve the integrity of the Landmarks Law, HDC monitors behavior of city government and the LPC, taking issue with actions and policies when as they see needed. HDC testifies before the City Planning Commission, the Art Commission, the Board of Standards and Appeals and the City Council, usually on the effect a proposal would have on historic neighborhoods. Sometimes, the HDC holds public assemblies to gauge the effect of political elections.

Landmarks Lion Award 
Since 1990, the Historic Districts Council has bestowed the Landmarks Lion Award upon those who have shown unusual devotion and aggressiveness in protecting New York City's historic buildings and neighborhoods.

The Landmarks Lions include:
Frank E. Sanchis III – 2022
Darren Walker and the Ford Foundation - 2021
50 Years of HDC - 2020
Anne Van Ingen - 2019
Boston Valley Terra Cotta; Friends of Terra Cotta; and Gladding, McBean - 2018
Jeffrey Greene and EverGreene Architectural Arts - 2017
Nancy Pearsall and Francis Morrone - 2016
Pride of Lions - 2015
Andrew Scott Dolkart - 2014
Hugh & Tiziana Hardy - 2013
Roberta Brandes Gratz - 2012
Barbaralee Diamonstein-Spielvogel - 2011
Robert A. M. Stern - 2010
Rev. Dr. Thomas F. Pike - 2009
Walter Melvin - 2008
Lisa Ackerman - 2007
Robert Silman - 2006 
Barry Lewis - 2005 
Beyer Blinder Belle Architects & Planners - 2004
Kitty Carlisle Hart - 2003
Kenneth K. Fisher - 2002 
Dorothy Miner - 2001 
Joyce Matz - 2000 
Anthony C. Wood - 1999
Dr. James Marston Fitch - 1998
Kent Barwick - 1997 
Edward S. Kirkland - 1996
Joan K. Davidson - 1995
Arlene Simon - 1994 
Otis Pratt Pearsall - 1994
Margot Gayle - 1993
Jack Taylor - 1992
Halina Rosenthal - 1991
Christabel Gough - 1990

Funding 
HDC's financing comes from grants by government entities such as the New York State Council on the Arts and the New York City Council; from private foundations, funds and corporations; from fund-raising events; and from individual donations. More than 700 Friends of HDC contribute on a regular basis and participate in its public activities.

References 

Historic preservation organizations in the United States
Historic districts in New York (state)
Non-profit organizations based in New York City
1985 establishments in New York City